Lucian (c. 125 – after 180) was a Roman rhetorician and satirist.

Lucian or Saint Lucian may also refer to:

People known as Saint Lucian
 Lucian of Antioch (c. 240–312), Christian theologian, martyr and saint
 Lucian of Beauvais (died c. 290), Christian martyr and saint
 Lucian of Chester (fl. 1195), Christian monk, author of De laude Cestrie
 Saint Lucian, a demonym for the people of the island nation of Saint Lucia
 Saint Lucian British, British people descended from the island nation of Saint Lucia

People with the given name
 Lucian Blaga (1895–1961), Romanian philosopher and poet
 Lucian Boz (1908–2003), Romanian literary critic
 Lucian Bute (born 1980), Romanian-Canadian boxer
 Lucian Freud (1922–2011), painter
 Lucian Georgevici (1875–1940), Romanian politician
 Lucian Mureșan (born 1931), Romanian Archbishop and a cardinal of the Catholic Church
 Lucian Pintilie (born 1933), Romanian film director
 Lucian "Lin" Wood (born 1952), American attorney, political commentator, and conspiracy theorist

Characters
 Lucian (Pokémon)
 Lucian (The 39 Clues)
 Lucian (Underworld)
 Lucian Connally, a character on the Longmire television series
 Dark Swordsman Lucian, a character in the Lunar Knights video game

Places
 Fort San Lucian, Malta

Other uses
 Lucian (crater), a lunar impact crater
 Saint Lucian, an adjective for things associated with Saint Lucia

See also
 Lucia (disambiguation)
 Luciana (disambiguation)
 Luciano (disambiguation)
 Lucien
 Lucius (disambiguation)
 Lucy (disambiguation)
 Santa Lucia (disambiguation)
 

Romanian masculine given names